Urkkad is a small residential area in the gram panchayat of Koviloor, Vattavada, in Idukki district, Kerala, India. Urkkad is 40 kilometers from Munnar. There are about 100 families, a Carmelite school, a healthcare centre and a Franciscan hermitage in the village. This area belongs to the village of Vattavada but it has its own cultural identity.

See also
Pampadum Shola National Park

References

Villages in Idukki district